Zarghami is a Persian surname. Notable people with the surname include:

Azizollah Zarghami (1884–1978), Iranian military officer 
Cyma Zarghami (born 1962), Iranian-American cable television executive
Ezzatollah Zarghami (born 1970), Iranian politician and military officer

Persian-language surnames